Riondel is on the eastern shore of Kootenay Lake in the West Kootenay region of southeastern British Columbia.

Explorers
The Ktunaxa showed Archibald McDonald of the Hudson's Bay Company the huge lead outcrop in 1844. However, the estimated  to the mouth of the Columbia River made the deposits worthless. By the 1880s, railroads advancing across the US, and steamboats travelling up the rivers into BC, would change the economics.

Sproule & Hendryx
In 1882, Robert Evan (Bob) Sproule staked four claims along the Riondel Peninsula, which included the Bluebell mine. In 1884, Sproule sold an interest in the mine to Dr. Wilbur A. Hendryx, but forfeited an interest to George Jennings Ainsworth to settle a partner's debt. In 1886, Sproule was hanged for murdering Thomas Hammill over a years earlier claim dispute. At this time, on buying out the Ainsworth interests, the mine ownership passed wholly to Hendryx's Kootenay Mining and Smelting Company (KM&S). The settlement was known as Hendryx or Hendryx Camp. When the ineffective Pilot Bay smelter closed in 1896, the Hendryx settlement was renamed the Blue Bell Camp.

Canadian Metal Company
In 1905, the Canadian Metal Company purchased the mine. The next year, the steamboat hulks containing dormitories were replaced by married men's cottages and single men's bunkhouses. In 1907, the settlement was renamed Riondel after Count Edouard Riondel, the company president and French banker. Often mispronounced, the correct way is Ree-on-del with accent very slightly on the first syllable. The concentrator, operational from 1908, proved effective. When new pumping equipment failed to keep pace with flooding at the lower levels, the mine was abandoned in 1921.

Fowler & Eastman
In 1924, engineer and entrepreneur, S.S. Fowler, with partner B.L. Eastman, obtained some financial backing from Canadian Pacific Railway’s Consolidated Mining and Smelting (CM&S) subsidiary to reopen the operation. Able to sufficiently dewater the mine, extraction resumed. After concentrating the zinc-rich lead ore using a methodology determined by the limited electricity supply, the product went to the Trail smelter. To raise further capital, the venture was incorporated in 1929 as the Blue Bell Mines Limited, but the October stock market crash financially ruined the partners.

Consolidated Mining and Smelting
The major creditor, CM&S assumed ownership, leaving the mine idle until after World War II. The Riondel population, formerly stable at around 70 people, dropped to 22 by 1943. Beginning in 1950, the mine and the settlement were refurbished at a cost of $1.3 million, including a new smelter. Hydroelectricity plants across the lake on the Kootenay River replaced local generators for the electricity supply. The mine operated from 1952 until exhausted in 1971. Having supported a population of 300, it was the longest active mine in the province. The site was abandoned four years later.

Post-mining community
Most employees departed, but many older ones stayed. Riondel became a popular retirement community, at one time having more seniors per capita than any other postal code in Canada.

Today Riondel is a tidy village with streets, a lakeside campground, beach, community centre, playground, cable TV system, 9-hole golf course, grocery and liquor store, cafe, and pub. In April 2006, Telus connected Riondel with dial-up internet.

Recreational activities

Hiking 
The Waterfront Trail follows  of the lakeshore from the south end of North Bay beach; 
15-minute Pilot Bay Lighthouse Trail leads to an historic 1907 lighthouse; 
The one-hour Pilot Bay Marine Park Trail covers varying terrain along the lakeshore; 
Plaid Lake Hiking Trail, near Crawford Bay, is a full-day hike to the alpine Plaid Lake on the west side of the Purcell Mountains; 
Duck Lakes Dykes Trail, near Sirdar, offers miles of almost level hiking through some of the richest waterfowl habitat in BC.

Golf 
The two golf clubs are the 9-hole, Par 3 course at the Riondel Golf Club (on Galena Bay Wharf Road, 10 minutes from the Kootenay Lake Ferry), and the 18-hole championship Kokanee Springs Golf Resort (in Crawford Bay).

Fishing 
Kootenay Lake is well stocked with many species of fish, including kokanee, rainbow and cutthroat trout, Dolly Varden, burbot, and whitefish. The lake supports record-sized Rainbow Trout. The world's largest recorded kokanee, almost , was caught in Kootenay Lake. Kokanee (Kekeni) means 'red fish' in the Sinixt Interior Salish language. It is the name given to the land-locked salmon that spawn in large numbers in Kokanee Creek in the late summer. The best fishing time is in the fall and winter months.

Camping 

Riondel Daze 
During the weekend of the Civic Holiday, Riondel hosts an annual celebration called Riondel Daze. The Historical Society of Riondel usually has its vintage ambulance, a 1949 Mercury, at the event. Other elements are a ball tournament with a hot dog stand, local music, and a stand-still parade.

Sundry 
Other outdoor opportunities in Riondel include canoeing or kayaking the waters of Kootenay Lake (rentals available), swimming, wildlife and nature viewing, boating and sailing, horse-drawn adventures, and backcountry exploration. On Sundays, a youth group at the Riondel Recreation Centre plays floor hockey and other games such as pool and air hockey; they also have movies available.

The Riondel Community Centre, in a former school, has an auditorium for community events. The Centre houses the Riondel Art Club, the Riondel Seniors' Society, the Riondel Commission of Management, Riondel Community Library, and the Historical Society. A children's playground is outside.

Footnotes

References
Community of Riondel
Kootenay Lake Region

Further reading 
 Bluebell Memories by A. Terry Turner
 A Recollection of Moments: Riondel 1907-2007 by Wendy M E Scott

Populated places in the Regional District of Central Kootenay
Populated places in the West Kootenay
Designated places in British Columbia